Mirjana Bilić-Vukas (born 11 May 1936 in Bačka Topola) is a former Serbian gymnast who competed internationally for Yugoslavia.

She represented Yugoslavia at the 1960 Summer Olympics.

External links

1936 births
Living people
Serbian female artistic gymnasts
Yugoslav female artistic gymnasts
Olympic gymnasts of Yugoslavia
Gymnasts at the 1960 Summer Olympics
People from Bačka Topola
European champions in gymnastics